William Dennis Williams (27 September 1905 – 8 March 1994) was an English professional footballer who played as a forward.

Career
Born in Leytonstone, he became the youngest ever professional at 15 years of age, when in 1921 he signed for West Ham United from Fairbairn House. On 6 May 1922 (making an appearance against Blackpool) at aged 16 years and 221 days, he became West Ham's youngest ever player; a record he held until Reece Oxford made his debut 23 days younger in 2015. The forward made 44 appearances in all competitions and scored nine goals for West Ham before joining Chelsea in 1927.
He played only one season for Chelsea, playing only two games without scoring.

References

1905 births
1994 deaths
English footballers
Association football forwards
Chelsea F.C. players
West Ham United F.C. players
English Football League players
Footballers from Leytonstone